The following highways are numbered 418:

Canada
Manitoba Provincial Road 418
Newfoundland and Labrador Route 418
  Ontario Highway 418

Japan
 Route 418 (Japan)

Norway

United Kingdom
  A418 road Leighton Buzzard - Aylesbury

United States
 Florida:
  Florida State Road 418
 Florida State Road 418 (former)
  Louisiana Highway 418
  Maryland Route 418
 New Mexico State Road 418
  New York State Route 418
  Pennsylvania Route 418
  Puerto Rico Highway 418
  South Carolina Highway 418
  Tennessee State Route 418